The Fear Is Excruciating, but Therein Lies the Answer is the third studio album by post-rock band Red Sparowes, released April 6, 2010.

Track listing

References

Red Sparowes albums
2010 albums
Sargent House albums